Darko Horvat may refer to:

 Darko Horvat (footballer) (born 1973), Croatian footballer
 Darko Horvat (politician) (born 1970), Croatian politician